In music pantonality may refer to:
Twelve-tone music, seen as an extension of tonality to all keys (rather than to no key)
Nonfunctional tonality or pandiatonicism

See also
Bitonality